Bagumbayan may refer to:

Places in the Philippines
 Bagumbayan, Sultan Kudarat, a municipality
 Bagumbayan Field, old name of Rizal Park, Manila
 Bagumbayan, Quezon City, a barangay in Quezon City, Eastern Manila District
 Bagumbayan, Taguig, a barangay in Southern Manila District
 Bagumbayan North, a barangay in Navotas, Northern Manila District
 Bagumbayan South, a barangay in Navotas, Northern Manila District

Other
 Bagumbayan–Volunteers for a New Philippines (Bagumbayan-VNP), a political party in the Philippines